John Saxton DD (d. 1382) was a Canon of Windsor from 1368 to 1382 and Precentor of Exeter.

Career

He was appointed:
King's Clerk
Provost of Wingham collegiate church 1368
Precentor of Exeter 1732

He was appointed to the fifth stall in St George's Chapel, Windsor Castle in 1368 and held the canonry until 1382..

Notes 

1382 deaths
Canons of Windsor